Inès Marie Lætitia Églantine Isabelle de Seignard de La Fressange (born 11 August 1957), is a French supermodel, fashion designer and perfumer. She was named to the International Best Dressed List Hall of Fame in 1998.

Biography

Family and childhood 
La Fressange was born in Gassin, Var, the daughter of André de Seignard, Marquis de La Fressange (b. 1932), a French stockbroker, and his wife, the former Cecilia "Lita" Sánchez-Davila, an Argentine-Colombian model closely related to two former presidents of Colombia, Alfonso Lopez Pumarejo and Alfonso Lopez Michelsen.

Her family on her father's side comes from an old French nobility, and had the seigneury of Fressange in the Velay (in Auvergne). Her uncle, Hubert de La Fressange (b. 1923), died in the Second World War on 2 October 1944 in Anglemont, during which he participated in its liberation. Her grandmother, the Marquise Simone de La Fressange, née Lazard was heiress to the Lazard banking fortune (Banque Lazard). She married two ministers in succession, Maurice Petsche, and then Louis Jacquinot.

Ines grew up in an 18th-century mill outside Paris with two brothers, Emmanuel, the eldest, and her younger brother, Ivan. She studied at the Tournelle Institution in Courgent, then at the Notre-Dame de Mantes-la-Jolie Institution in the Yvelines where she got her baccalaureate at the age of 16, and then went to the École du Louvre in Paris.

Career 

Tall at 180 cm (5'11") and with a weight of 50 kg (110 lb), she began her career as a model in 1974 at the age of 17. She quickly became nicknamed by many as "the talking mannequin", due to her tendency to talk with fashion journalists and express her opinions on her profession and on fashion.

In 1975, at the age of 18, La Fressange appeared for the first time in photos by Oliviero Toscani for Elle magazine, then modelled for Thierry Mugler and other designers.

In 1983 she became the first model to sign an exclusive modeling contract with the haute couture fashion house, Chanel, by fashion designer Karl Lagerfeld, whose muse she became due to her remarkable resemblance to the brand's founder, Coco Chanel, who died in 1971. 

However, in 1989, Lagerfeld and La Fressange had an argument and parted company. Likely this argument was, at least in part, regarding her decision to lend her likeness to a bust of Marianne, the ubiquitous symbol of the French Republic. Lagerfeld reputedly condemned her decision, saying that Marianne was the embodiment of "everything that is boring, bourgeois, and provincial" and that he would not dress up historic monuments.

In 1991, with the financial support of the luxury brand, Orcofi, she created her own brand 'Inès de la Fressange' and opened her own Boutique, selling various products such as perfumes originating from the area in which her grandfather lived, at 12 Avenue Montaigne in the 8th arrondissement of Paris. It was an immediate success not only in France, but also in the US and in Japan.

In December 1999, due to equity dilution, she was made redundant from her own company in which she was not a majority shareholder, her majority co-shareholders insisting it was because she had designed a pill-dispenser for the 'Elixir of Abbé Soury'. She lost the rights to use her name and personal brand, which she fought five years for in court.

She walked the runway for Gaultier during an event, at age 51. She also walked the Chanel spring-summer 2011 show.

La Fressange and fashion journalist Sophie Gachet are the authors of Parisian Chic, a Style Guide.

Personal life 
On 9 June 1990, in Tarascon, France, she married nobleman Luigi d'Urso (1951–2006), who was an Italian railroad executive. Luigi was the son of Don Alessandro d'Urso, and his wife, Donna Clothilde Serra dei Duchi di Cassano, daughter of Don Luigi Serra, 9th Duke di Cassano, and Elizabeth Grant; and descendant of George Clymer, one of the Founding Fathers of the United States, who signed both the United States Declaration of Independence in 1776 and the United States Constitution in 1787). Luigi and Inès had two daughters, Nine Marie d'Urso (born 27 February 1994) and Violette Marie d'Urso (born 6 August 1999). She also has two stepdaughters, Clotilde d'Urso and India d'Urso, the daughters of Luigi d'Urso by his first wife, Guendalina Levier.

Ancestry

References

External links 

1957 births
Living people
French fashion designers
French female models
French nobility
French people of Argentine descent
People from Var (department)
French women fashion designers